This is a list of memorials to John Tyler, the 10th president of the United States.

Some places and institutions previously named for Tyler have been renamed due to Tyler's having been a slaveholder and a legislator for the Confederate States of America during the American Civil War. The new names are indicated in the lists below.

Places
Tyler, Texas
Tyler County, Texas

Sculptures

John Tyler Memorial (1915), by Raymond Averill Porter, Hollywood Cemetery, Richmond, Virginia

Schools
John Tyler Community College, Chester, Virginia—renamed Brightpoint Community College
John Tyler High School, Tyler, Texas—renamed Tyler High School
John Tyler Elementary School, Hampton, Virginia—renamed Mary S. Peake Elementary School
John Tyler Elementary School, Portsmouth, Virginia—renamed Waterview Elementary School

Buildings
Tyler Hall (named for both John Tyler and his son Lyon Gardiner Tyler) at the College of William & Mary, Williamsburg, Virginia—renamed Chancellors' Hall

Streets
Tyler Street, Chicago, Illinois—renamed Congress Street in 1872
John Tyler Drive, Chester, Virginia—planned to be renamed Brightpoint Drive

See also
 Presidential memorials in the United States

References

Tyler, John
Tyler, John